CKLF-like MARVEL transmembrane domain-containing protein 2 (i.e. CMTM2), previously termed chemokine-like factor superfamily 2 ( i.e. CKLFSF2), is a member of the CKLF-like MARVEL transmembrane domain-containing family (CMTM) of proteins. In humans, it is encoded by the CMTM2 gene located in band 22 on the long (i.e. "q") arm of chromosome 16. CMTM2 protein is expressed in the bone marrow and various circulating blood cells. It is also highly expressed in testicular tissues: The CMTM2 gene and CMTM2 protein, it is suggested, may play an important role in testicular development. 

Studies find that the levels of CMTM2 protein in hepatocellular carcinoma tissues of patients are lower higher than their levels in normal liver tissues. CMTM2 protein levels were also lower in the hepatocellular carcinoma tissues that had a more aggressive pathology and therefore a possible poorer prognosis. Finally, the forced overexpression of CMTM2 protein in cultured hepatocellular tumor cells inhibited their invasiveness and migration. These findings suggest that CMTM2 protein suppresses the development and/or progression of hepatocellular carcinoma and therefore that the CMTM2 gene acts as a tumor suppressor in this cancer. Patients with higher CMTM2 levels in their linitis plastica stomach cancer (i.e. a type of gastric cancer also termed diffuse-type gastric cancer or diffuse type adenocarcinoma of the stomach) tissues had better prognoses than patients with lower CMTM2 levels in their linitis plastica tissues. And, the CMTM2 gene has been found to be more highly expressed in the salivary gland adenoid cystic carcinoma tissues of patients who did not develop tumor recurrences or perineural invasion of their carcinomas compared to the expression of this gene in patients whose adenoid cystic carcinoma tissues went on to develop these complications. These findings suggest that the CMTM2 gene may act as a tumor suppressor not only in hepatocellular carcinoma but also in linitis plastica and salivary gland adenoid cystic carcinoma. Further studies are needed to confirm these findings and determine if CMTM2 protein can serve as a marker for the severity of these three cancers and/or as a therapeutic target for treating them.

References

Further reading

External links 
 

Human proteins
Gene expression